Ibuka is an umbrella organisation that connects the groups that aid survivors of the 1994 Rwandan genocide,  it was established in December 1995. It also participates in the international arena through events like the 2010 Geneva Summit for Human Rights and Democracy.

"Ibuka" is a Kinyarwanda word for "remember".

References

External links 

neveragaininternational.org
genevasummit.org

Rwandan genocide
Organizations established in 1995